Red an orchestra was an American chamber orchestra based in Cleveland, Ohio.

Established in 2001, its Artistic Director and conductor was Jonathan Sheffer.  The orchestra's repertoire spanned the work of Renaissance composers including Heinrich Schütz to contemporary classical composers including Frank Zappa, John Corigliano, and Sheffer himself.  Red also engaged in innovative multimedia collaborations with film, puppetry, visual art, narration, and other art forms.

Red an orchestra received reviews in The Plain Dealer and the Akron Beacon Journal.

The orchestra suspended operations in March 2008 due to financial difficulties.

See also
Cleveland Chamber Symphony
CityMusic Cleveland
Cleveland Orchestra
Cleveland Philharmonic
Cleveland Women's Orchestra

References

2001 establishments in Ohio
2008 disestablishments in Ohio
Disbanded American orchestras
Chamber orchestras
Musical groups from Cleveland
Musical groups established in 2001
Musical groups disestablished in 2008